The Song of Life is a 1931 German film directed by Alexis Granowsky.

Plot 
After discovering that her elderly fiancé has false teeth, a young bride-to-be becomes so distraught that she contemplates suicide. She is rescued by a young sailor, with whom she has a baby, which she eventually delivers by Caesarian section.

Reception 
This film stirred up a storm upon release for its depiction of a Caesarian birth. Though not much was really shown, it was enough to cause women filmgoers—and not a few men—to faint. The film was banned outright in Germany and ran into some censorship problems in the US; still, by its very controversial nature it proved to be a hit wherever it was shown.

External links 

1931 films
Films of the Weimar Republic
1930s German-language films
1931 drama films
German black-and-white films
Films directed by Alexis Granowsky
German drama films
1930s German films